is a Japanese football player. He plays for FC Osaka.

Playing career
Yasuhiro Fukuda joined to J3 League club; FC Ryukyu in 2014. In July 2015, he moved to FC Osaka.

References

External links

Profile at FC Osaka

1992 births
Living people
Osaka Gakuin University alumni
Association football people from Okayama Prefecture
Japanese footballers
J3 League players
Japan Football League players
FC Ryukyu players
FC Osaka players
Association football midfielders